RTL Kockica is a Croatian specialized TV channel for children, young people and families owned by the CME Group as of 1 June 2022. RTL Kockica started broadcasting on 11 January 2014 at 11:01 am.

On 15 March 2021, RTL Kockica changed the logo.

History 
RTL Kockica even broadcasts related series made by Disney Junior and Disney Channel, which are: Violetta, Doc McStuffins, Jake and the Never Land Pirates, Soy Luna, Mickey Mouse Clubhouse, Phineas and Ferb, The Lion Guard and Miraculous: Tales of Ladybug and Cat Noir. However, Sofia the First, Sheriff Callie’s Wild West, My Friends Tigger & Pooh, Henry Hugglemonster, Amphibia, Calimero, Tangled: The Series, Mira, Royal Detective, Miles from Tomorrowland, and many others haven’t been broadcast by RTL Kockica. Henry Hugglemonster has reruns.

On 15 March 2021, RTL Kockica unveiled a new visual identity and a new logo.

Anime
 Mermaid Melody Pichi Pichi Pitch
 Sailor Moon

Current programming
 Touché Turtle and Dum Dum
  Maya the Bee (TV series)
 Masha and the Bear
 Masha's Tales
 Wild Kratts
 The Flintstones
 Crtež Dana
 Sport za sve
 Mickey Mouse Clubhouse
 Jake and the Neverland Pirates
 Doc McStuffins
 Soy Luna
 Violetta (TV series)
 Sammy and Friends
 Pat & Mat
 Vremeplov
 Zak Storm
 Čarobni Štapić
 Bush Baby
 Lucky Luke
 Skitalica - pitalica
 Luna Petunia
 Kung Fu Panda: Legends of Awesomeness
 Oggy and the Cockroaches
 Johnny Test
 Phineas and Ferb
 Baka priča najljepše priče
 Looney Tunes
 Only Fools and Horses
 Star Trek: The Next Generation
 The Lion Guard
 Miraculous: Tales of Ladybug & Cat Noir
 My Little Pony: Friendship Is Magic
 Thomas & Friends
 Winx Club
 EnTenTinići

References

External links
 

Television channels in Croatia
RTL Group
Television channels and stations established in 2014
2014 establishments in Croatia
Croatian-language television stations
Mass media in Zagreb
Children's television channels in Croatia
Television channels in North Macedonia
Children's television channels in North Macedonia